Walther von Corswant (14 April 1886, Gumbinnen – 12 December 1942, Greifswald) was a German politician who served as the Nazi Party Gauleiter of Gau Pomerania and in several government positions in Nazi Germany.

Early years
Walther von Corswant was born in 1886, the son of an estate owner. After attending elementary and high school and a year in the military, he attended six semesters between 1904 and 1907 at the Deutsche Kolonialschule in Witzenhausen that trained people in agriculture for resettlement in Germany’s overseas colonies. He then worked as a planter in Cameroon and New Guinea. Due to a stomach illness, Corswant left the tropics and returned to Germany. After regaining his health, he studied for a semester at the agricultural college in Jena. Following a one-year unpaid internship in agriculture, Corswant took over his parents' estate, of Kuntzow in the Greifswald district of Pomerania.

At the outbreak of World War I in 1914, Corswant enlisted in the army as a member of the 2nd Guards Infantry Regiment but soon was medically discharged due to a recurrence of his stomach ailment. He returned to agricultural work.

Nazi Party career
In 1923 he joined the Nazi Party (NSDAP) but when it was outlawed following the Beer Hall Putsch, he associated with the German Völkisch Freedom Party. After the ban on the Nazis was lifted, Corswant rejoined the Party on 10 June 1925 (membership number 7,342). He was made Bezirksleiter (District Leader) in Vorpommern (Western Pomerania). By 1927, Adolf Hitler was replacing several early Party leaders whom he considered to be too socialistic or not to have the necessary attributes to be effective administrators. Consequently, on 1 May 1927 Corswant was appointed Deputy to Gauleiter Theodor Vahlen of Pomerania who was placed on indefinite leave, and von Corswant effectively was left in charge. On 21 August, Vahlen was formally relieved of his position and Corswant officially became Gauleiter.

In November 1929, Corswant became the parliamentary group leader of the NSDAP bloc in the Provincial Landtag of the Province of Pomerania. At the same time he was also a member of the Provincial Committee. Also in 1929, he founded a weekly Nazi newspaper, Die Diktatur. In the election of September 1930, Corswant was elected to the Reichstag for electoral constituency 6 (Pomerania) and remained a member of the German parliament until his death.

Corswant remained Gauleiter of Pomerania until 1 April 1931 when he was succeeded by Wilhelm Karpenstein. He then took up a position in the Economic Policy Department of the Party central leadership (Reichsleitung) in Munich. Until the Nazi seizure of power in 1933, Corswant acted as the department's representative to the Weimar Republic. On 1 October 1935, Corswant became a member of the Reich Farmers’ Council (Reichsbauernrat) serving until April 1941, when he became a member of the Reich Advisory Council for Food and Agriculture. Also in 1935, Corswant was made a member of the Prussian Provincial Council for Pomerania, and on 27 February 1936 he was appointed District Administrator of the Greifswald Landkreis (District). He retained both of these positions until his death. On 23 April 1936, Corswant was named to the Supreme Court of Honor and Discipline of the German Labor Front (DAF). Corswant died on 12 December 1942 and was buried in the chapel of the family’s Kuntzow estate.

References

Sources

External links
 

1886 births
1942 deaths
Gauleiters
German Army personnel of World War I
Members of the Reichstag of Nazi Germany
Members of the Reichstag of the Weimar Republic
Nazi Party officials
Nazi Party politicians
20th-century German newspaper publishers (people)